Governor Whitfield may refer to:

Henry L. Whitfield (1868–1927), 41st Governor of Mississippi
James Whitfield (Mississippi politician) (1791–1875), 18th Governor of Mississippi